Bratislava Lamač railway station is a small railway station (technically a train halt) inside the Lamač borough of Bratislava, Slovakia. Until 1947 the station was called "Lamač". The railway station is administered under Bratislava main railway station, with the station master residing there as well. It lies at the edge of the Lamač and Dúbravka boroughs of Bratislava.

Bratislava Lamač railway station is the smallest true railway station in Bratislava. It contains four tracks of rails allowing the trains to cross tracks or the express trains to overtake slower passenger or freight trains. The station building was reconstructed in 2007.

History 
In the past, stone from the nearby quarry was loaded onto trains here. The narrow-rail line for this purpose was built in 1924.

On 21 May 2012 a 41-year-old woman died when she stumbled at the first platform when crossing the lines, falling down under a passing train. The accident caused seven trains to be delayed for a total time of 201 minutes.

Rail lines 
The following is a list of rail lines crossing this station.
 Line No. 110: Bratislava - Kúty

Access 

A few meters away from the main station building there is a public bus stop called Stanica Lamač, sometimes officially abbreviated to Stn. Lamač. Buses no. 30, no. 37, no. 38, no. 63 and no. 92 stop here as well as night busses no. N21 and no. N37. The railway station is a short walk away for many people from the Lamač and Dúbravka boroughs of Bratislava.

This bus stop serves also as a minor intercity bus stop for buses headed towards Stupava and Malacky in the Záhorie region of Slovakia.

References

External links 
 Page about the railway station with pictures in Slovak
 Pictures of the former look of this railway station

Railway stations in Bratislava